Dante Leonelli (born September 15, 1931 in Chicago, Illinois, United States) is an American pioneer of kinetic light sculpture and a former tutor at Hornsey College of Art and the Royal College of Art.

In 1968, Leonelli formed the Continuum group with artists Michael McKinnon and Robert Janz. Their group exhibition toured  Sheffield, Hull, Manchester and Oxford, culminating in the first exhibition of kinetic light art to be shown at the Hayward Gallery.

More recently, Leonelli has proposed Eco Halos, which monitor and reflect changing levels of environmental traffic and air pollution. Leonelli has work in national and international collections.

References

External links 
 
 Ecohaloproject.com

Living people
American contemporary artists
Neon artists
Kinetic sculptors
Contemporary sculptors
1931 births